Perittia sepulchrella is a moth in the family Elachistidae. It was described by Stainton in 1872. It is found in Morocco.

References

Moths described in 1872
Elachistidae
Moths of Africa